This is a list of museums in Mali.

List 
 National Museum of Mali (Musée National du Mali)
 Muso Kunda Museum of Women (Musée de la Femme)
 Musee de site de Djenné
 Musée Dogon de Fombori "Banque Culturelle"
 Musée du Sahel
 Musée Munincipal de Tombouctou

See also 
 List of museums

External links 
 Museums in Mali

 
Mali
Museums
Museums
Mali